Ali Imran (born 18 July 1985) is a Pakistani first-class cricketer who played for Quetta cricket team.

References

External links
 
 

1985 births
Living people
Pakistani cricketers
Quetta cricketers
Cricketers from Gujranwala